Soosan Lolavar is a British-Iranian composer, sound artist and educator. She has composed electronic and acoustic music for the concert hall, contemporary dance, installation, film, animation and theatre.

Life 
Soosan Lolavar was born and raised in London. She holds dual British-Iranian citizenship as her father is Iranian. She studied Social and Political Sciences at Cambridge University, Musicology at Oxford University and Composition at Trinity Laban Conservatoire of Music and Dance. In 2015 she was awarded a Fulbright Scholarship to Iranian music at Carnegie Mellon University in Pittsburgh. She teaches Composition at Trinity Laban Conservatoire of Music and Dance. Her research interests centre on ethnomusicology with a particular emphasis on the politics of gender and sexuality, post-colonialism and the music industry and postmodernism in electronic musics. She is researching at City University for a PhD on contemporary composition in Iran.

Works 
Lolavar works in both electronic and acoustic sound, and across the genres of concert music, contemporary dance, installation, film, animation and theatre.

Opera 

 ID, Please First performed by Pittsburgh Opera April 2017

Theatre, Dance and Film 

 Between You and Me: Music for the play by Edward Thomasson (2013)
 Dawn: They Too Circled Warily (2013)
 Music for the film One Shot (2014).

Orchestral 

 Aqua Triumphalis (2012)
 Things Come Together (2013)

Vocal 

 Mah Didam First performed by the Hermes Experiment, 2016

Chamber & Instrumental 

 Fulcrum for solo harp (2013)
 Protect Me From What I Want (2015, London Sinfonietta commission)
 Manic (2016) composed for the Carpe Diem Quartet
 Girl (2017)

References

External links 
 Official Website
 Rebecca Lentjes, "5 Questions for Soosan Lolavar", I Care If You Listen, 12 September 2017
 Briony Cartmell, "The opera shining a light on Trump's travel ban", Huck, 25 July 2017

Year of birth missing (living people)
Living people
Alumni of the University of Oxford
Iranian composers
Musicians from London
Alumni of the University of Cambridge
Alumni of Trinity Laban Conservatoire of Music and Dance
British composers